The A36 is a trunk road and primary route in southwest England that links the port city of Southampton to the city of Bath. At Bath, the A36 connects with the A4 to Bristol, thus providing a road link between the major ports of Southampton and Bristol. It also provides a link between Bristol and London via the A303.

Route 
Originally, the A36 continued to Avonmouth, beyond Bristol, but this section was renumbered to the A4.

Within Bath the A36 acts as a ring road on the southern side of the river, from the junction with the A4 at Newbridge to the west of the city. From here traffic can continue to Bristol on the A4 or to Wells and Weston-super-Mare via the A39 and A368 roads. Another link to the A4 on the eastern side at Cleveland Bridge, which provides a route to the M4 motorway via the A46, is highly congested.

The A36 leaves Bath in an easterly direction towards Bathampton, then turns south to follow the Avon through its steep-sided valley, climbing out of the valley beyond Limpley Stoke. The road passes near a number of towns and a city, including Frome, Warminster, Wilton and Salisbury in Wiltshire, and Totton in Hampshire, on the western outskirts of Southampton, where it meets the M27 motorway and the A35.

Standard of route
The majority of the A36 is built to single carriageway standard, but parts of it have been upgraded to dual carriageway. The A36 is dual carriageway for its 1 mile (1.6 km) bypass of the village of Beckington, 3 miles (5 km), briefly combined with the A361 north of Frome. It shares part of Warminster bypass with the A350. It is also dualled for approximately 1 mile (1.6 km) near its grade separated junction with the A303 road, 8 miles (13 km) north-west of Wilton.

The A36 in Salisbury acts as the city's ring road, bypassing the city centre to dual carriageway standard. Just south-east of Salisbury the largest dualled section runs for about 4 miles (6 km), bypassing the village of Alderbury. Then, the road is briefly dualled from its roundabout with the A3090 to the M27 motorway (junction 2) – this part of the road is erroneously thought by some to have been previously known as the A36(M); prior to the opening of the Totton Western Bypass on the other side of the junction, it was named as a spur of the M27, and hence is built to motorway standards. The A36 reverts to single carriageway standard through Totton until it terminates.

Points of interest

External links

SABRE page on A36

Roads in England
Roads in Hampshire
Roads in Somerset
Roads in Wiltshire